Shek Lau Tung is a village in the Fo Tan area of Sha Tin District, Hong Kong.

Administration
Shek Lau Tung is a recognized village under the New Territories Small House Policy.

See also
 Kau Yeuk (Sha Tin)

References

Villages in Sha Tin District, Hong Kong
Fo Tan